Patricio "Pato" Ignacio Escala Pierart is a Chilean animator and film producer. He is best known for producing, editing and animating the short animated film Bear Story (2015), which won for Best Animated Short Film at the 88th Academy Awards; the first Chilean film to do so, and Nahuel and the Magic Book (2020). He shared the win with director Gabriel Osorio Vargas. The film also entered various film festivals worldwide, receiving numerous awards and nominations.

Life and career

Early life
His father, who was a military under Pinochet's ruling, died when Escala was 17. Escala used to listen to revolutionary rock bands such as Los Miserables. He studied to become a veterinarian for two years, and then studied communications.

Career
Escala founded his studio Punkrobot with his girlfriend, his sister and her boyfriend.

In August 2017, he launched the production of the animated series' pilot Guitar & Drum.

Personal life

Other roles 
President of Animachi (Chile’s national animation lobby)

References

External links
 

1982 births
Living people
Chilean film producers
Directors of Best Animated Short Academy Award winners
Academic staff of the University of the Americas (Chile)